HMS Skate was a  which served with the Royal Navy. Built by Vickers, she was launched on 13 March 1895 and sold on 9 April 1907.

Construction and design
On 8 November 1893, the British Admiralty placed an order with the Naval Construction and Armament Company of Barrow-in-Furness (later to become part of Vickers) for three "Twenty-Seven Knotter" destroyers as part of the 1893–1894 construction programme for the Royal Navy, with in total, 36 destroyers being ordered from various shipbuilders for this programme.

The Admiralty only laid down a series of broad requirements for the destroyers, leaving detailed design to the ships' builders.

Displacement was 300 long tons light and 340 long tons deep load. Three funnels were fitted, with the foremast between the ship's bridge and the first funnel. The ship's crew was 53 officers and men.

Skate was laid down on 20 March 1894 as Yard number 235, was launched on 13 March 1895 and completed in January 1896.

Service history
In 1897 Skate was in reserve at Devonport. In 1900 she was commissioned to serve at the Mediterranean station, and was ordered to return home in early 1902. She left Gibraltar on 9 May, convoyed by the cruiser , and arrived in Plymouth on 14 May. She paid off at Devonport on 20 May, and was placed in the A Division of the Fleet Reserve. Lieutenant James Farie was appointed in command on 1 August 1902, as she took part in the fleet review held at Spithead on 16 August 1902 for the coronation of King Edward VII. Lieutenant Robert Mairis Haynes succeeded him in command later the same month, on 28 August, when she was attached to the Devonport instructional flotilla. During a cruise with the flotilla the following November, a heavy sea swept the upper deck and partially carried away the fore-bridge and twisted other fittings, leading skate to abort the cruise and return to dock for repairs.

In 1906 Skate was used as a target in firing trials of the effectiveness of various guns against destroyers. 3-pounder (47 mm) guns proved ineffective, having difficulty penetrating the ship's plating in end-on engagements, and while 12-pounder (3-in (76 mm)) guns caused more damage, it was concluded that a single hit could not be guaranteed to disable a destroyer. 4-inch (102 mm) guns proved much more effective, particularly when Lyddite-filled shells were used, and this led to a change in destroyer armament to 4-inch guns. Sold in 1907 to Cox & Co. of Falmouth, Cornwall for £305, she was the first destroyer of this type to go to the breakers.

References

Bibliography
 
 

 

 
 
 

Sturgeon-class destroyers
Ships built in Barrow-in-Furness
1895 ships
Victorian-era destroyers of the United Kingdom